Hadi Khanifar is an Iranian football midfielder who currently plays for Iranian football club Esteghlal Khuzestan in the Iran Pro League.

Club career
Khanifar was introduced to Iranian football by Foolad in 2006. He also had experiences with Shahin Bushehr, Mes Sarcheshmeh, Esteghlal Ahvaz and Esteghlal Khuzestan. He helped Esteghlal Khuzestan in promoting to top flight of Iranian football in 2013. As Summer 2014 he was named club captain.

Club career statistics

Honours 
Esteghlal Khuzestan
Iran Pro League (1): 2015–16
Iranian Super Cup runner-up: 2016

References

External links
 Hadi Khanifar  at PersianLeague.com
 Hadi Khanifar at IranLeague.ir

1983 births
Living people
Iranian footballers
Foolad FC players
Esteghlal Ahvaz players
Esteghlal Khuzestan players
Sportspeople from Khuzestan province
Association football midfielders